T4 is the name of a tram produced by ČKD Tatra. It is the narrower variant of the Tatra T3 model. A large number of cars was supplied to the GDR, the USSR, Romania and the former Yugoslavia using names T4D, T4SU, T4R and T4YU, respectively. The T4 was originally developed in 1968 and has been continuously modernized or copied since.

Types

T4D 

In Germany this type came into four former provincial cities: Dresden, Halle (Saale), Leipzig and Magdeburg. It has space for 26 seats and 88 standees. Between 1968 and 1986 a total of 1,766 vehicles were delivered. The trailers of the T4D-series were called B4D. The trailers have two more seats instead of the driver's cab. 789 trailers were delivered to the above-mentioned cities.

Thus combinations of several cars became possible. This was called "Großzug" ("big train") and most-commonly consisted of two motor cars and a trailer. After the German reunification, Germany began a modernization of the T4D cars. The modernized cars are designated as T4D-C (Halle), T4D-M (Leipzig), T4D-MS or T4D-MT (Dresden). Unmodernized T4Ds were mostly taken out of service. Today (2010), unmodernized T4Ds are only used as works cars. Magdeburg gave away some cars to the Romanian cities of Oradea and Cluj-Napoca. Cars from Halle are used today in Kaliningrad, Iaşi, Belgrade (one car, garage number 1004), Sofia; Leipzig and Dresden vehicles are used in Pyongyang (North Korea) and Rostov-on-Don (Russia).

Despite still being in working order, the T4Ds were withdrawn from regular service in Dresden mostly due to accessibility concerns, as low floor vehicles are now mandated for all new purchases. The T4D still sees service on lines to and from Dresden Technical University and during the Christmas market in order to deliver more frequency. In Leipzig, the number of low-floor cars is increased by using low-floor trailer cars. The T4 is remarkable particularly for its distinctive design, which differs strongly from later "box" or modern trams.

T4SU 

Since those were too narrow for T3 and the factory in Gotha stopped its production, the T4s was sold as T4SU to the Soviet Union. Like the other CSU types, a closed operator's cab was included. No trailer cars were used.

T4R 
The Romanian vehicles do not differ technically and structurally from the Soviet. Since the vehicles were suitable, due to the smaller car body width, for most Romanian networks, they were used more frequently and differently from the T3. Delivery started to the ITB between 1973 and 1975, followed by Arad in 1974 and later in other cities from 1978. Their introduction in Bucharest required a specially-built depot for them along with a new team of well-trained technicians to fix these trams. They have almost always been allocated to the Militari depot, apart from a short time when they were temporarily transferred to the Dudești depot in order to allow the facility at Militari to be renovated.

In 1998, RATB began a project of modernisation of the T4R cars by making an articulated six-axled car from two T4R cars. The new vehicle type is named "Bucur". The project progresses very slowly due to financial problems, and the number of trams to be produced is also uncertain, although they originally intended to convert all existing 130 T4 cars into 65 modernised vehicles. Modernized vehicles before 2003 featured own-made carbodies, but from 2003 onwards, they featured a carbody that set the standard for the V3A-CH-PPC and V3A-2010-CA modernizations. The modernization project halted in 2011, and only a few are in service today, some of them being out of order due to the heavy shortage of parts (a common problem for the STB these days).

The T4R trams in Bucharest are numbered 3301 to 3431, but there have been only 130 cars delivered. The tram with number 3339 has never been delivered. An urban legend tells that ČKD had wrongly printed the number and RATB sign on a car that was delivered elsewhere, then they sent the last car for Bucharest with the number 3431. However, RATB's documents always mention 130 T4R trams for Bucharest, and not 131.

The Tatra T4R is arguably one of the best vehicles the STB (and its predecessors, RATB and ITB) had so far. However, in the last years, lack of maintenance and care for the trams have hampered their performance and reliability, and only a handful of examples survive today, most of them having been cannibalized for spare parts, and the remaining ones undergoing refurbishment. An incident on 12 March 2019, where the wheels of tram 3381 (made in 1974) collapsed, forced the RATB to permanently withdraw the T4Rs in service, but after a few days they returned to service due to the shortage of trams on the network. They only run in solo formations, since they have been banned to run in double formations after tram 3385 (used as a trailer) caught fire on 23 August 2017.

In other cities, this type has been permanently withdrawn, and only a handful of examples survive today. Their imports stopped in 1981 due to the Romanian austerity policies that imposed a "no imports" rule for public transport vehicles, being replaced by Timiș 2 trams.

T4YU 

The Yugoslav T4s was delivered starting from 1967. The two motor coaches delivered for the then Yugoslav, now Serbian, capital Belgrade used electrical equipment of the T4D. One car came back to Prague a short time later, and was used for excursion trips. The other was rebuilt as a trailer car and shipped to Halle (Saale). In 1972, twenty T4s were delivered to Belgrade with Soviet equipment, and were used by Belgrade tram network from 1972 till 1991.
 
Second largest Yugoslav city, today Croatian capital Zagreb, bought 95 vehicles between 1976 and 1982, 60 of them being still in use as of January 2012.  Zagreb cars are similar in their electrical equipment to the German variant.

Nowadays, in Germany, only one T4YU is used, more precisely in Halle, a vehicle which was donated by Dresden.

Production 
2,635 trams were produced from 1967 to 1987 and delivered to:

Note: This is the list of first owners. Stock may have later been resold to other cities not on this list.

Photo gallery

References

External links 

Tatra trams
Tram vehicles of Croatia
Tatra T4D
Tram vehicles of Romania
Tram vehicles of Serbia
Tram vehicles of Ukraine